Lisa Rowe Fraustino is an American writer and editor of children's literature.

Biography 

In 1961 Lisa was born in Dover-Foxcroft, Maine. She currently lives with her husband in Connecticut where she teaches at Eastern Connecticut State University.

Education 

Lisa has a Ph.D. from Binghamton University.

Career 

A professor of English at Eastern Connecticut State University, Lisa is also a visiting associate professor at the Hollins University Graduate Program in Children's Literature. In 2006 Lisa was the recipient of the Fulbright Scholarship with which she journeyed to Thailand in order to teach and consult in children's literature at Mahasarakham University.

Scholarships 

Lisa was awarded a Fulbright Scholarship in 2006. She chronicled her experiences teaching and traveling through Thailand at her wikispace.

Books

Picture Books

The Hickory Chair (an ALA Notable Book)

Novels

The Hole in the Wall (Milkweed Prize for Children's Literature)
Ash: A Novel (an ALA Best Book for Young Adults)
I Walk in Dread: the Diary of Deliverance Trembly, Witness to the Salem Witch Trials (Dear America series)
Grass and Sky

Anthologies

Don't Cramp My Style: Stories About That Time of the Month
Dirty Laundry
Mothers in Children’s and Young Adult Literature: From the Eighteenth Century to Postfeminsim
Soul Searching: Thirteen Stories About Faith and Belief

Poetry
Hitching to Istanbul

References

External links 
Lisa's home page.

1961 births
Living people
American children's writers
Binghamton University alumni
Eastern Connecticut State University
People from Dover-Foxcroft, Maine
Writers from Maine
Presidents of the Children's Literature Association